The November Coalition is a non-profit grassroots organization, founded in 1997, which fights against the War on Drugs and for the rights of the prisoners incarcerated as the effect of that war. It publishes a bulletin called Razor Wire.

Tyrone Brown

The November Coalition was involved in the advocacy for Tyrone Brown's release. Brown, an African American Texan, has been sentenced to life imprisonment for smoking marijuana. On March 9, 2007, Governor Rick Perry signed a conditional pardon which released Brown under supervision.

See also 
 Prisoners' rights
 War on Drugs
 Drug Policy Alliance
 Students for Sensible Drug Policy
 National Organization for Reform of Marijuana Laws
 Marijuana Policy Project

References

External links 
 

Penal system in the United States
Cannabis law reform organizations based in the United States
Drug policy reform
Non-profit organizations based in Washington (state)
Organizations established in 1997
Prison-related organizations
1997 in cannabis